BlackSpider Technologies Limited was a British software company founded in 2002 and subsequently acquired by SurfControl in July 2006.

The Company provided cloud computing services for filtering email spam and other malware.

History
BlackSpider was a start-up company founded in 2002 by John Cheney in Reading,  Berkshire, UK.

In January 2004 Casenove Private Equity invested £4.6m ($6.6m) in the business, allowing the organisation to grow into the French and German markets.

In July 2006 SurfControl, a UK listed PLC, acquired BlackSpider for £19.5m in cash.

At the point of acquisition BlackSpider had £4m in historic revenues, an operating loss of £3.1m and over 1,200 customers.

In October 2007 Websense acquired SurfControl for approximately £204m.

Following the acquisition of SurfControl by Websense, the original BlackSpider Management Team, including John Cheney, left to found Workbooks.com, a provider of web-based CRM software for small businesses.

Products

MailControl was the brand name for BlackSpider Technologies email filtering services.  These products are now sold by Forcepoint under the brand name Hosted Email Security.

Notes

External links 
Companies House, UK Company Number: 04447164
Insider Article - 7 January 2004
 Silicon Article Surfcontrol Catches Blackspider - 16 July 2006
John Layden, The Register - 13 July 2006
Websense Investor Release - 3 October 2007

Software companies of the United Kingdom
Cloud applications